Bhilgoan is a village in Kasrawad Tehsil in Khargone district in the Indian state of Madhya Pradesh.

Geography

It is located 38 km towards the north from District headquarters Khargone. 262 km from State capital Bhopal. Bhilgoan is surrounded by Maheshwar Tehsil towards the north, Thikri Tehsil towards the west, Gogawan Tehsil towards the south, Dharampuri Tehsil towards the west.

Economy

Maheshwar near Bhilgaon is noted as a center for weaving colorful cotton saris, with distinctive designs involving stripes, checks and floral borders. Additionally, other material used for making kurtas etc. are also made here.

Cotton, soybeans, red chili peppers and wheats are main crops in this area. The Bhilgaon and surrounding areas are developing very rapidly. A thread manufacturing unit has been established in this village. Bhilgaon was earlier known as Bhileshwar.

Schools In Bhilgaon

Pragya Vidhya Mandir Bhilgaon
Govt. Middle Bhilgaon
Aadi.g. Ashram Bhilgaon

References

Villages in Khargone district